In Your Pocket City Guides is a publisher of free guide books for many European cities, available in print, via website or via mobile app. It also publishes guide books for major events in Europe including the FIFA World Cup and the UEFA European Championship. It is based in Vilnius, Lithuania.

Guide books can be downloaded from the website free of charge in PDF. Guide books are also provided in video format on YouTube.

The first In Your Pocket city guide, Vilnius In Your Pocket was written by German journalist Matthias Lüfkens and Belgian brothers George, Oliver, and Nicolas Ortiz in Vilnius, Lithuania and published in December 1991.

Reception
The guide books have received the following mentions:

 In 2013, The Wall Street Journal described the style as "tongue-in-cheek advice" with "brutal honesty". 

 In 2005, The New York Times described the guide as "an Eastern European publishing phenomenon".

 In 2007, The Times referred to the guides as "The best guides to Eastern Europe".

 In an article about Riga in 2006, The New York Times noted it is "a good all-around information site" 

 In 2005, The Independent listed the guides among the "ten best travel websites" because "the writers/compilers live locally and the guides are frequently updated".

 In 2005, The Guardian wrote "InYourPocket.com was the first online travel guide to come up with the idea of offering free downloadable city guides in printable (PDF) format".

 In 2008, The Guardian noted that it "is a brilliant resource written by excellent writers whose slant is always 'off the trail'."

 In 2007, The Observer wrote it is "the most reliable source". 

The guide books have also been mentioned in the Lonely Planet, Let's Go Travel Guides, and Rough Guides.

References

External links
 

1991 establishments in Lithuania
Lithuanian travel websites
Travel guide books
Series of books